Eastburn may refer to:

Places
 Eastburn, East Riding of Yorkshire, England
 Eastburn, West Yorkshire, England
 Eastburn, Illinois, a community in the United States
People
 Henry Eastburn, a British draughtsman and civil engineer 
 Joseph Eastburn Winner, a composer publishing under an alias of Eastburn
 Lacey Eastburn, president of Northern Arizona University
 Manton Eastburn, a Bishop in the Episcopal Diocese of Massachusetts

See also
 Westburn (disambiguation)